Never Picture Perfect is the fourth solo album by songwriter Rich Mullins and was released in 1989 on Reunion Records.

Track listing
All songs by Rich Mullins.

Side one
 "I Will Sing" – 1:27
Appeared on compilation Songs 2 1999
 "Hope To Carry On" – 2:33
Appeared on compilation Songs 2 1999
Earlier recording appeared on Behold the Man 1981
 "While The Nations Rage" – 4:50
Appeared on compilation Songs 1996
 "First Family" – 3:06
 "Alrightokuhhuhamen" – 4:12
Appeared on compilation Songs 1996

Side two
 "Higher Education and The Book of Love" – 5:47
 "Bound to Come Some Trouble" – 3:41
Appeared on compilation Songs 2 1999
 "The Love of God" – 2:48
Appeared on compilation Songs 2 1999
 "My One Thing" – 3:42
Appeared on compilation Songs 1996
 "Somewhere" – 4:32
Appeared on compilation Songs 2 1999
 "The Love of God (reprise)" – 0:49

Charts

Radio singles

Personnel 

 Rich Mullins – lead vocals, acoustic piano (4, 7, 8), hammered dulcimer (9)
 Reed Arvin – keyboards (2, 3, 5, 6, 9, 10), Synclavier (3, 5, 6, 9, 10), string arrangements 
 Jerry McPherson – guitars (2–6, 9, 10), mandolin (10)
 Mark O'Connor – mandolin (4), fiddle (4)
 Tom Hemby – guitar solo (9)
 Jimmie Lee Sloas – bass (2, 3, 5, 6, 9, 10)
 Danny O'Lannerghty – bass (4)
 Paul Leim – drums (2, 3, 5, 6, 9, 10)
 Bill Sinclair – harmonica (5, 9)
 Ed Calle – saxophone (6)
 Kristin Wilkinson – string contractor 
 Ashley Cleveland – featured vocals (1)
 Pam Tillis – featured vocals (1)
 Richard Gibson – backing vocals (1)
 Donny Monk – backing vocals (1)
 Guy Penrod – backing vocals (1)
 Jon Sherberg – backing vocals (1)
 Gary Smith – backing vocals (1)
 Chris Rodriguez – backing vocals (2, 6)
 Bonnie Keen – backing vocals (5, 9)
 Marabeth Jordan – backing vocals (5, 9)
 Marty McCall – backing vocals (5, 9)
 Margaret Becker – backing vocals (6)

Production 

 Reed Arvin – producer
 Michael Blanton – executive producer
 Terry Hemmings – executive producer
 Bill Deaton – engineer, mixing 
 Brent King – additional engineer
 Digital Recorders (Nashville, Tennessee) – mixing location
 OmniSound Recording Studio (Nashville, Tennessee) – recording studio
 Big Dog Studio (Wichita, Kansas) – recording studio
 The Pond (Franklin, Tennessee) – recording studio
 Hank Williams – mastering at MasterMix (Nashville, Tennessee)
 D.L. Rhodes – cover coordinator
 Jackson Design – art direction, design
 Mark Tucker – photography

References 

Rich Mullins albums
1989 albums
Albums produced by Reed Arvin